The 1927 Toronto Argonauts season was the 41st season for the team since the franchise's inception in 1873. The team finished in third place in the Interprovincial Rugby Football Union with a 2–3–1 record and failed to qualify for the playoffs.

Regular season

Standings

Schedule
The Argonauts' home game on November 12 was played at Varsity Stadium.

References

Toronto Argonauts seasons